Paap is a 2003 Indian crime thriller film, directed by Pooja Bhatt in her directorial debut, and features John Abraham, Udita Goswami, Gulshan Grover and Mohan Agashe. The film received mixed reviews from critics, praising its cinematography, direction, but criticism for screenplay. The film is remembered for its soundtrack and also marked the Bollywood debut of singer Rahat Fateh Ali Khan with Mann Ki Lagan.

The film was inspired by Witness (1985).

Plot
The story is about a young girl, Kaaya (Udita Goswami), living in the beautiful serene valley of Spiti, waiting to join a Buddhist monastery, an idea which has been fed to her since childhood by her father (Mohan Agashe) and one which she has never questioned. When Lama Norbu (Denzil Smith), a senior lama from the monastery has a dream that the Buddhist teacher, Rinpoche has been reborn, he sends Kaaya to Delhi to bring him back to the monastery. Kaaya goes to Delhi and manages to get the child, but just when they are about to return home, the child witnesses the murder of a police officer in a hotel. The investigations are taken over by another police officer, Shiven (John Abraham) who prohibits Kaaya and the young boy from returning home. During this time, the boy identifies Raj Mehra (Gulshan Grover) as the murderer. Soon Shiven finds himself in a web of intrigue and deceit where he can trust no one. He is forced to make an escape to Spiti along with Kaaya and the young boy who he is now determined to protect. Shiven has however seriously been injured and upon reaching Spiti has to undergo treatment at Kaaya's home.

While nursing him back to health, Kaaya is attracted to Shiven, an exciting feeling she has never experienced before. Shiven too finds himself drawn to Kaya, a girl unlike any he has ever known. Kaya is caught in a dilemma for she has too long subdued her basic instincts and desires in her search for the 'ultimate truth'. A sexual attraction is one that her conditioned mind sees as a sin (paap), but one she cannot deny. Shiven sees this dilemma and tries to show Kaya that there is a life out there which she has a full right to live. In the meantime, Kaya's father finds out about what has been going on under his roof and is furious with Shiven. He sees Shiven as a polluting influence upon his peaceful life, a man who has brought defiling things like pistols into their home. At this juncture, Shiven's past catches up with them and Mehra's men are close on his heels.

After much chaos, finally, Shiven and Kaaya are shown reuniting with the passionate kiss in the climax.

Cast
 John Abraham as Inspector Shiven 
 Udita Goswami as Kaaya
 Gulshan Grover as CP Raj Mehra
 Mohan Agashe as Kaaya's father 
 Bikramjeet Kanwarpal as Ratan Singh
 Denzil Smith as Lama Norbu
 Sandeep Mehta as DCP Sushil Mathur
 Anahita Uberoias Anna
 Madan Bhiku – Llahmo, the reincarnated boy
 Ahsan Baksh as Zakir
 Vikram Kapadia as Anna's husband
 Aishwarya Mehta as Niloufer, Zakir's wife
 Netaji as Lama Dorje
 Ritika Luthria as DCP's wife
 Megha Burman as DCP's daughter

Release
The film became the first Bollywood film to be premiered at Karachi International Film Festival (KARA) on 20 December 2003. It was commercially released on 30 January 2004.

Music

The film's music was by Anu Malik, Shahi, Ali Azmat, with several instrumental tracks by Music Mashrooms. The soundtrack featured several instrumental pieces as well as song, notably the hit songs Garaj Baras by Ali Azmat, the lead vocalist of the Pakistani band, Junoon and noted Sufi singer also from Pakistan, Rahat Fateh Ali Khan's, Laagi Tumse Mann Ki Lagan, which also marked his debut as a Bollywood playback singer. The songs have been written by Sayeed Quadri, Sabir Zafar, Ali Azmat, Amjad Aslam Amjad.

Track listing

Reception

Critical response
The film received mixed reviews. Sukanya Verma of Rediff.com wrote "Frankly, I had expected something more hard-hitting from this articulate actress turned filmmaker. Although Bhatt maintains an intense mood throughout, Paap isn't sinful enough." Taran Adarsh of Bollywood Hungama gave the film 2.5 stars out of 5, writing "On the whole, PAAP satiates the appetite of the urban audience looking for a story-based fare. At the box-office, the film should find patronage at multiplexes of metros mainly. For those looking for typical Bollywood masala fare, PAAP has very little to offer. Also, lack of aggressive promotion may curtail its business to an extent!." Manish Gajjar of BBC.com wrote "On the whole Paap is different from the regular Bollywood pot boilers. Its different, it's daring but, definitely not sinful."

Awards 
Won
 2005: Stardust Superstar of Tomorrow - Male – John Abraham

Nominated
Zee Cine Award Best Lyricist for The Song "Intezaar".
Zee Cine Award Best Debuting Director Pooja Bhatt
Zee Cine Award Best Newcomer Udita Goswami

References

External links
 

2003 films
2000s Hindi-language films
2003 crime thriller films
Films set in Himachal Pradesh
Films scored by Anu Malik
Films about Buddhism
Clerical celibacy
Films about sexuality
Indian crime thriller films
Films shot in Himachal Pradesh
2003 directorial debut films